Suibhne mac Duinnshléibhe was a late 12th-century, and early 13th-century, lord in Argyll. He does not appear in contemporary records, although his name appears in the patronymic names of two of his sons. Suibhne appears in the 16th century Leabhar Chlainne Suibhne, which documents the early history of Clann Suibhne. This account claims that he is the ancestor of Irish clan, and that he was the builder of Castle Sween in Knapdale, Argyll. However, other sources suggest the castle was built in the late 11th century by Suibhne MacAnrahan, brother of the High King of Ireland. Suibhne is said to be identical to the "Swineruo", or Suibhne Ruadh ("Suibhne the Red"), recorded in the Ane Accompt of the Genealogie of the Campbells, a 17th-century Clan Campbell genealogy.

Background

Suibhne is thought to have flourished in the late 12th century, and early 13th century. He does not appear in any contemporary records, but the records of patronymic names of his sons and descendants prove his existence. His name, Suibhne, has been stated by some commentators to be Gaelic in origin, and by others to be Norse in origin. The name itself is Gaelic, meaning "pleasant". The name was sometimes used as a Gaelic form of the Old Norse Sveinn, meaning "boy", "servant". He is stated to have been Thane of Glassrie (Glassary) and Knapdale.

Sources

Leabhar Chlainne Suibhne

The Leabhar Chlainne Suibhne is a traditional account of Clan Sweeney. It was written in Ireland, starting in about 1513. The Leabhar Chlainne Suibhne states that Suibhne was the son of Donnshléibhe, son of Aodh Aluinn, son of Anradhán. The account claims that Anradhan was the younger son of Aodh Athlamhan. When his brother succeeded their father, the two brothers quarrelled with each other, and Anradhán sailed to Scotland. There he conquered half of the country before making peace with the King of Scots, by marrying his daughter. Suibhne is credited within the account to have built Castle Sween. His son is named as Maolmhuire an Sparáin ('Maolmhuire of the Purse').

Sellar noted that Suibhne's supposed ancestor in the Leabhar Chlainne Suibhne, Aodh Athlamhan, appears in contemporary (and independent) records, such as the Annals of Ulster. Aodh Athlamhan was King of Aileach, and succeeded his father Flaithbhertach. The Annals of Ulster record that Aodh Athlamhan's died in the year 1033. However, Suibhne's supposed ancestors Anrothan, Aodh Alainn and Donnshléibhe, do not appear in any contemporary sources. Sellar noted that Anradhán's supposed elder brother, Domhnall an tOgdhamh ('Domhnall the Young Ox'), is an ancestor of the O'Neills. According to W.D.H. Sellar, there is no reason to doubt the Leabhar Chlainne Suibhne's claim that Suibhne was the eponymous ancestor of the Sweeneys, or the builder of Castle Sween. Sir Iain Moncreiffe of that Ilk proposed that Anradhán married a daughter of either a King of Argyll, or a sub-King of Cowal, rather than a King of Scots.

Ane Accompt of the Genealogie of the Campbells

Suibhne has been identified with the "Swineruo" (Gaelic: Suibhne Ruadh, meaning 'Suibhne the Red') who appears in the 17th century traditional account of Clan Campbell known as Ane Accompt of the Genealogie of the Campbells. This account is thought to be based on an account by the 17th century Clan Campbell historian Neil MacEwan. In the late 18th century, a similar version of this account was compiled, which brought the history down to its present date; this account is known as Manuscript B.

The Ane Accompt of the Genealogie of the Campbells states that the Campbell ancestor "Coline Campbell, bynamed Maol Maith" had a legitimate son, and two natural sons. One of the natural sons, Iver, was borne by the daughter of Swineruo. The account describes Swineruo as the owner of Castle Sween, and as Thane of Knapdale and Glassary. The account states that, Iver was the ancestor of the MacIver Campbells, who were numerous in Glassary and Craignish. Manuscript B of Ane Accompt of the Genealogie of the Campbells states that, according to tradition, Swineruo took his daughter from Campbell, and married her to MacLachlan (the chief of Clan MacLachlan), and give him a portion of his lands in Glassary.

MS 1467

The MacEwen pedigree is indecipherable in places. Skene's transcription and translation are as follows.

According to Niall Campbell, 10th Duke of Argyll, who wrote in the early 20th century, the manuscript shows that the MacEwens of Otter were 'MacSweens'—male-line descendants of Suibhne. Argyll considered that the name Skene took for Sabarain, who is listed as a son of Duinsleibe, was actually "Suibhneach", or Suibhne, son of Donnshléibhe. Argyll considered the manuscript showed that the chiefs of the MacEwens (who he thought, should have been known as MacSweens) were as follows (from Walter up to Suibhne): Baltuir, Eoin, Eoghan, Giollaesbuig, Iain, Dugal, Suibhne. In the late 20th century, Sellar noted that the pedigree shows that the MacEwens did not descend from Suibhne, and that they took their surname from chief Eoghan, son of Gillespie. Sellar stated that it seemed that Gillespie was a great-grandson of "Saibaran" (Skene's Sabarain), who was another one of Donnshléibhe's sons. Sellar noted that, according to Leabhar Chlainne Suibhne, Donnshléibhe had twelve sons.

Successors

Suibhne had two sons who appear in contemporary records. His son Dubhghall is recorded as granting, and witnessing, several charters. He was seated at Skipness Castle, in Kintyre. Maol Mhuire mac Suibhne married the granddaughter of a King of Connacht, High King of Ireland: the Annals of the Four Masters record that Beanmhidhe, daughter of Toirdhealbhach mac Ruaidhrí Ó Conchobhair, and wife of Maol Mhuire mac Suibhne, died in 1269. Beanmhidhe's grandfather, and Toirdelbach's father, was Ruaidrí Ua Conchobair, King of Connacht, High King of Ireland (d. 1198). The descendants of Maol Mhuire mac Suibhne founded the various branches of the Irish Clann Suibhne.

Places associated with Suibhne

Suibhne is said to have left his name to Loch Sween, and to have built Castle Sween (Scottish Gaelic: Caisteal Suibhne) which overlooks its shores in Knapdale. The castle is thought to date to the late 11th century. It has been described as one of the oldest stone castles in Scotland. The original castle was a simple enclosure, and was abandoned by the MacSweens in the 13th century. The Castle underwent extensive remodelling while in the possession of the Stewart earls of Menteith. In 1310, it was in the possession of Sir John Menteith, when the English king Edward II granted the ancestral MacSween lands to John MacSween and his brothers. The castle was finally destroyed in the mid 17th century.

Notes

References
Footnotes

Bibliography

Medieval Gaels from Scotland
12th-century Scottish people
13th-century Scottish people